KSID-FM (98.7 MHz) is a radio station broadcasting a country music format. Licensed to Sidney, Nebraska, United States, the station is currently owned by Mike Flood and Andy Ruback, through licensee Flood Communications West, LLC.

History
On May 5, 2021, KSID-FM changed their format from hot adult contemporary to country, branded as "98.7 The Big Boy".

References

External links

SID-FM
Country radio stations in the United States
Radio stations established in 1974